Jessica Davidson (born 3 May 2003) is an Australian cricketer who currently plays for New South Wales in the Women's National Cricket League (WNCL) and Sydney Thunder in the Women's Big Bash League (WBBL). She plays as a right-arm fast-medium bowler.

Domestic career
Davidson became part of the New South Wales pathway programme at the age of 14. She was signed by Sydney Thunder as a replacement for the injured Shabnim Ismail for the 2021–22 Women's Big Bash League season, but did not play a match. She made her debut for New South Wales on 30 September 2022, against Western Australia in the WNCL, taking 1/14 from her 2 overs. She went on to play one more match for the side that season.

References

External links

Jessica Davidson at Cricket Australia

2003 births
Living people
Place of birth missing (living people)
Australian women cricketers
New South Wales Breakers cricketers
Sydney Thunder (WBBL) cricketers